William Seager may refer to:

 William Seager (philosopher) (born 1952), Canadian philosopher
 William Seager (businessman) (1862–1941), Welsh shipping magnate and Liberal Party politician